Nizhal Moodiya Nirangal is a 1983 Indian Malayalam-language film, directed by Jeassy and produced by P. A. Thomas. The film stars Sharada, Ratheesh, Bharath Gopi and Ambika in the lead roles. The film has musical score by KJ Joy.

Cast

Bharath Gopi as Unni
Sharada as Sosamma
Ratheesh as Baby
Ambika as Molamma
Balan K. Nair as Thambi
Jagathy Sreekumar as Nanappan
Kaviyoor Ponnamma as Thambi & Unni's Mother
Manavalan Joseph as Pillechan 
P. A. Thomas as Cherian
Master Piyush
Master Prince
Kalaranjini as Daisy
Achankunju as Achankunju
Alummoodan
Baby Sangeetha
Baby Vandana
Bahadoor as Kunjaalikka
Chandraji
Mala Aravindan as Kuruppachan
Ranipadmini as Leela 
Ravi Menon as Boban
Santhakumari as Thresya
Silk Smitha as Cabaret Dancer

Soundtrack
The music was composed by K. J. Joy and the lyrics were written by Sreekumaran Thampi.

References

External links
 

1983 films
1980s Malayalam-language films